Dinosapien is a 15-episode children's television program. The series is a co-production between BBC Worldwide and CCI Entertainment Ltd., in association with BBC Kids, Discovery Kids and CBBC.

Overall 15 episodes were made, each 21 and half minutes long (30 minutes total when factoring in commercials). The series is filmed in Bragg Creek, Alberta. The program made its debut on March 24, 2007, on Discovery Kids and CBBC. The series ended on June 30, 2007. Each program contains around six minutes of CGI. Brittney Wilson stars as Lauren Slayton, Suzanna Hamilton as Dr. Slayton and James Coombes as the villain, Dr. Aikens. Because of the Native Americans role in the series, the show could possibly be loosely based on Turok.

Sci-fi veteran David Winning directed the pilot and first three episodes and Brendan Sheppard, known for his work on Doctor Who DVDs, directed five episodes.
Marc Lougee, veteran of several award-winning animated series (including MTV's Celebrity Deathmatch and the CBC's What It's Like Being Alone) directed CG animation and Visual Effects/2nd unit for the series prior to filming The Pit and the Pendulum, a stop motion animated adaptation of Edgar Allan Poe's classic tale. The Pit and the Pendulum was executive produced by animation icon Mr. Ray Harryhausen, joined by DINOSAPIEN producer Pete Denomme and Fred Fuchs.

Premise
The program focuses on what would happen if dinosaurs had continued to exist and evolve into more intelligent beings (Lauren mentions in the opening credits "Everyone thinks dinosaurs are extinct, but what if they're wrong?"). It is set at Dinosaur Explorer Camp, a dinosaur-themed summer camp in Canada, where Dr. Hillary Slayton lives with her teenage daughter Lauren. Dr Slayton's husband Alan mysteriously disappeared on a fossil expedition into the Badlands and her daughter hasn't come to terms with his disappearance. Lauren is, however, the first human to encounter one of the evolved dinosaurs, which she eventually gets to know. Throughout the series Dr. Slayton befriends Dr. Aikens (who later turns villainous) and Lauren makes many friends before finding out more about dinosaurs and her father's disappearance.

Cast
 Brittney Wilson as Lauren Slayton
 Bronson Pelletier as Kit Whitefeather
 MacKenzie Porter as Courtney
 Jeffrey Watson as Chris Langhorn
 Suzanna Hamilton as Dr. Hilary Slayton
 James Coombes as Dr. Clive Aikens
 Alexandra Gingras as Danny Ort
 Brendan Meyer as Nelson Ort
 Dean Manywounds as Ten Bears

Dinosaurs
Eno - A  theropod teenage dinosaur who is pale green with red and yellow stripes along his back, has a grey underbelly, pheasant-like feathers on the head (like human hair) and tail, yellow hawk-like forward eyes, feet like a dromaeosaur, and a short snout. In fact, Lauren confirmed that Eno's kind evolved from the species Dromaeosaurus. Like a parrot, Eno can copy and use words almost in context, but despite his intelligence, he has a four-year-old child's grammar when he talks. Eno is known to make squawking sounds similar to that of a bird, and quite sensitive to high-pitched sounds; they have a tendency to scare and drive him away. He is also known for climbing trees, but only for hiding or escaping. Judging from an incident when Eno was seen eating hot dogs and leaves, he is possibly omnivorous.

The Diggers - Two rather goofy bipedal cross-between Prenocephale and Pinacosaurus, but with little arms like a T. rex. Their species is described as "Ornithosapien" by Danny and Nelson in episode 12. They are insectivores. They are Eno's enemies, and they chase him persistently. They also chase everyone else and seem just evil. They can make things and use tools. They have a weakness though; they can be disabled temporarily by very bright lights (shown by nictitating eyelids). Lauren has nicknamed them Green Eyes (the male) and Cerepta (the female). The Diggers were apparently killed in the final episode in the Badlands when the Thunderbird cloud ignited Aiken's dynamite stash. This is not certain, since Aikens survived the explosion making it possible that they could have as well. Since Cerepta is female and the leader of the duo it might hint that in their species the females are most dominant.

Episodes

Broadcast
Dinosapien first aired as a weekly series on Saturdays on BBC Kids in Canada from March 24 to June 30, 2007. This was the basis of its original run.

The series was then aired on CBBC Channel in the United Kingdom beginning May 10, 2007. This was started by the first two episodes back-to-back, followed by a weekly basis of one episode each week on Thursdays. The finale aired on August 9, 2007. The series was made available on the network until October 14, 2010.

In the United States, Dinosapien premiered from July 7 to August 11, 2007, as a miniseries event on Discovery Kids for its original run. The premiere began on Saturdays with the first four episodes aired back-to-back in a two-hour block, followed by four one-hour blocks of two episodes each. The final three episodes were aired in a block of one hour and thirty minutes. The series also briefly aired in reruns on The Hub until March 24, 2012.

References

External links
 
 
 David Winning (director) official web site
 Marc Lougee (Director/ Animation) official web site

2000s Canadian children's television series
2000s Canadian science fiction television series
2007 Canadian television series debuts
2007 Canadian television series endings
2000s British children's television series
2000s British science fiction television series
2007 British television series debuts
2007 British television series endings
British children's fantasy television series
British children's science fiction television series
Canadian children's fantasy television series
Canadian children's science fiction television series
BBC children's television shows
Discovery Kids original programming
Television series about dinosaurs
Television series about summer camps
Television series about teenagers
English-language television shows
Television shows filmed in Alberta
Television shows set in Alberta